Ireland participated in the Eurovision Song Contest 2014 with the song "Heartbeat," written by Jonas Gladnikoff, Rasmus Palmgren, Patrizia Helander and Hazel Kaneswaran. The song was performed by Can-linn featuring Kasey Smith. The Irish broadcaster Raidió Teilifís Éireann (RTÉ) organised the national final Eurosong 2014 in order to select the Irish entry for the 2014 contest in Copenhagen, Denmark. Five songs faced the votes of five regional juries and a public televote, ultimately resulting in the selection of "Heartbeat" performed by Can-linn featuring Kasey Smith as the Irish Eurovision entry.

Ireland was drawn to compete in the second semi-final of the Eurovision Song Contest which took place on 8 May 2014. Performing during the show in position 9, "Heartbeat" was not announced among the top 10 entries of the second semi-final and therefore did not qualify to compete in the final. It was later revealed that Ireland placed twelfth out of the 15 participating countries in the semi-final with 35 points.

Background 

Prior to the 2014 contest, Ireland had participated in the Eurovision Song Contest forty-seven times since its first entry in 1965. Ireland has won the contest a record seven times in total. The country's first win came in 1970, with then-18-year-old Dana winning with "All Kinds of Everything". Ireland holds the record for being the only country to win the contest three times in a row (in 1992, 1993 and 1994), as well as having the only three-time winner (Johnny Logan, who won in 1980 as a singer, 1987 as a singer-songwriter, and again in 1992 as a songwriter). In 2011 and 2012, Jedward represented the nation for two consecutive years, managing to qualify to the final both times and achieve Ireland's highest position in the contest since 2000, placing eighth in 2011 with the song "Lipstick". The Irish entry in 2013, "Only Love Survives" performed by Ryan Dolan, managed to qualify to the final but placed last.

The Irish national broadcaster, Raidió Teilifís Éireann (RTÉ), broadcasts the event within Ireland and organises the selection process for the nation's entry. RTÉ confirmed their intentions to participate at the 2014 Eurovision Song Contest on 20 May 2013. From 2008 to 2013, RTÉ had set up the national final Eurosong to choose both the song and performer to compete at Eurovision for Ireland, with both the public and regional jury groups involved in the selection. For the 2014 Eurovision Song Contest, RTÉ announced on 31 October 2014 the organisation of Eurosong 2014 to choose the artist and song to represent Ireland at the contest with the continuation of the mentor system that involved five music professionals each selecting one entry for the competition.

Before Eurovision

Eurosong 2014 
Eurosong 2014 was the national final format developed by RTÉ in order to select Ireland's entry for the Eurovision Song Contest 2014. The competition was broadcast on RTÉ One as well as online via the broadcaster's official website rte.ie and at the official Eurovision Song Contest website eurovision.tv during a special edition of The Late Late Show held on 28 February 2014 and hosted by Ryan Tubridy.

Competing entries 
On 31 October 2013, RTÉ revealed the five mentors responsible for selecting the five finalists. The mentors had until 3 January 2014 to submit details regarding their selected artist and song and had until 3 February 2014 to submit their recorded versions of the entries for the competition. The mentors were:

Billy McGuinness – Guitarist for Irish rock-band Aslan
Cormac Battle – RTÉ 2fm presenter and vocalist and guitarist for Kerbdog and Wilt
Hazel Kaneswaran – Singer and songwriter
Mark Murphy – Tour manager
Valerie Roe – Band manager

The five finalists were announced on 5 February 2014 and the songs to be performed by the finalists were presented on 6 February 2014 during Rick in the Afternoon broadcast on RTÉ 2fm and Mooney broadcast on RTÉ Radio 1.

Final 
The national final featured commentary from a panel that consisted of music manager Louis Walsh, presenter Eoghan McDermott, producer Maia Dunphy and singer and former contest winner Linda Martin. Guest performers included Johnny Logan performing a medley of "What's Another Year", "Hold Me Now" and "Why Me?", and Paul Harrington and Charlie McGettigan performing "Rock 'n' Roll Kids". Following the 50/50 combination of votes from five regional juries and public televoting, "Heartbeat" performed by Can-linn featuring Kasey Smith was selected as the winner.

At Eurovision

According to Eurovision rules, all nations with the exceptions of the host country and the "Big Five" (France, Germany, Italy, Spain and the United Kingdom) are required to qualify from one of two semi-finals in order to compete for the final; the top ten countries from each semi-final progress to the final. The European Broadcasting Union (EBU) split up the competing countries into six different pots based on voting patterns from previous contests, with countries with favourable voting histories put into the same pot. On 20 January 2014, a special allocation draw was held which placed each country into one of the two semi-finals, as well as which half of the show they would perform in. Ireland was placed into the second semi-final, to be held on 8 May 2014, and was scheduled to perform in the second half of the show.

Once all the competing songs for the 2014 contest had been released, the running order for the semi-finals was decided by the shows' producers rather than through another draw, so that similar songs were not placed next to each other. Ireland was set to perform in position 9, following the entry from Finland and before the entry from Belarus.

In Ireland, the semi-finals were broadcast on RTÉ2 and the final was broadcast on RTÉ One with commentary by Marty Whelan. The second semi-final and final were also broadcast via radio on RTÉ Radio 1 with commentary by Shay Byrne and Zbyszek Zalinski. The Irish spokesperson, who announced the Irish votes during the final, was Nicky Byrne.

Final 

Can-linn and Kasey Smith took in technical rehearsals on 30 April and 3 May, followed by dress rehearsals on 7 and 8 May. This included the jury final on 7 May where professional juries of each country, responsible for 50 percent of each country's vote, watched and voted on the competing entries.

The Irish performance featured Kasey Smith performing with the members of Can-linn which included two male backing dancers: Thomas Spratt and Tarik Shebani and two female backing vocalists: Jenny Bowden and Donna Bissett. Can-linn and Kasey Smith were joined on stage by violinist Denice Doyle. The Irish performance featured a stage atmosphere of warm shades of reds, yellows and oranges with Celtic inspired shapes and patterns against a backdrop that transitioned from dark seas with lightning bolts to an orange sky with green water. The dress Kasey Smith wore was designed by Kathy de Stafford with a neckpiece designed by Oliver Doherty Duncan.

At the end of the show, Ireland was not announced among the top 10 entries in the second semi-final and therefore failed to qualify to compete in the final. It was later revealed that Ireland placed twelfth in the semi-final, receiving a total of 35 points.

Voting 
Voting during the three shows consisted of 50 percent public televoting and 50 percent from a jury deliberation. The jury consisted of five music industry professionals who were citizens of the country they represent, with their names published before the contest to ensure transparency. This jury was asked to judge each contestant based on: vocal capacity; the stage performance; the song's composition and originality; and the overall impression by the act. In addition, no member of a national jury could be related in any way to any of the competing acts in such a way that they cannot vote impartially and independently. The individual rankings of each jury member were released shortly after the grand final.

Following the release of the full split voting by the EBU after the conclusion of the competition, it was revealed that Ireland had placed tenth with the public televote and fourteenth with the jury vote in the second semi-final. In the public vote, Ireland scored 47 points, while with the jury vote, Ireland scored 33 points.

Below is a breakdown of points awarded to Ireland and awarded by Ireland in the second semi-final and grand final of the contest, and the breakdown of the jury voting and televoting conducted during the two shows:

Points awarded to Ireland

Points awarded by Ireland

Detailed voting results
The following members comprised the Irish jury:
 Patrick Hughes (jury chairperson)General Manager Sony Music Ireland
 Charlie McGettigansinger, songwriter, winner of the Eurovision Song Contest 1994
 Leanne Mooresinger, journalist, presenter
 Jenny GreeneDJ, radio presenter
 Liam Reillysinger, songwriter, represented Ireland in the 1990 contest

References

2014
Countries in the Eurovision Song Contest 2014
Eurovision
Eurovision
Articles containing video clips